The Enigma Files is a British television police procedural that ran for one series of fifteen episodes in 1980.

Plot summary
The series was a police procedural, written by Derek Ingrey, about a police officer who has been sidelined from regular duties and, having been placed in charge of a records and evidence unit, has begun to specialise in investigating unsolved crimes.

Regular cast and characters
Tom Adams as Detective Chief Inspector Nick Lewis
Sharon Maughan as Kate Burton, the unit administrator (first eight episodes only)
Carole Nimmons as Sue Maxwell, the unit administrator (last seven episodes only)
Duggie Brown as Phil Strong, a laboratory technician

Video release
There are no known releases on Video Tape or DVD.

Other media
A tie-in book of the series, written by Christine Sparks, was published by the BBC in June 1980 ( / ).

See also
The investigation of "Cold Cases" became a theme for several detective dramas and reality series some two decades later, including:

Cold Squad, CAN / CTV, 1998
Cold Case Files, USA / A&E, 1999 (true cases)
Waking the Dead, UK / BBC One, 2000
New Tricks, UK / BBC One, 2003
Cold Case, USA / CBS, 2003
Solved, USA / ID, 2008  (true cases)
 Zettai Reido,  Japan / Fuji Television, 2010
 Cold Justice, USA / TNT, 2013 (true cases)
 To Catch a Killer, CAN / OWN, 2014 (true cases)
Signal, South Korea / TVN, 2016
Signal, Japan / Fuji TV, 2018

References

External links
 

BBC television dramas
1980s British police procedural television series
1980 British television series debuts
1980 British television series endings